Boppin' with the Chet Baker Quintet is an album by trumpeter Chet Baker which was recorded in 1965 and released on the Prestige label.

Reception

Allmusic rated the album as 3 stars.

Track listing 
All compositions by Richard Carpenter except where noted.
 "Go-Go" – 4:32
 "Lament for the Living" (Tadd Dameron) – 7:00
 "Pot Luck" – 8:14
 "Bud's Blues" (Sonny Stitt) – 6:17
 "Romas" (Dameron) – 6:52
 "On a Misty Night" (Dameron) – 7:33

Personnel 
Chet Baker – flugelhorn
George Coleman – tenor saxophone
Kirk Lightsey – piano
Herman Wright – bass
Roy Brooks – drums

References 

Chet Baker albums
1967 albums
Prestige Records albums